Bethesda Methodist Protestant Church is a historic Methodist Protestant church located at Brinkleyville, Halifax County, North Carolina. It was built in 1853, and is a one-story, vernacular Greek Revival-style heavy timber-frame building.  It is sheathed in weatherboard. has a pedimented gable front, paired entrances, and rests on a stuccoed stone pier foundation.  Adjacent to the church is the contributing church cemetery.

It was listed on the National Register of Historic Places in 2012.

References

Methodist churches in North Carolina
19th-century Methodist church buildings in the United States
Churches on the National Register of Historic Places in North Carolina
Greek Revival church buildings in North Carolina
Churches completed in 1853
Churches in Halifax County, North Carolina
National Register of Historic Places in Halifax County, North Carolina
1853 establishments in North Carolina